Archibald Hosie (22 August 1873 – 21 April 1953) was an Australian rules footballer and coach for the  Football Club in the South Australian Football Association.

In 1902, Archibald Hosie captained South Australia to a win over Victoria on the Melbourne Cricket Ground.

References

Port Adelaide Football Club (SANFL) players
Port Adelaide Football Club players (all competitions)
Port Adelaide Football Club (SANFL) coaches
Australian rules footballers from South Australia
1873 births
Year of death missing